Seattle Sporting FC is an American amateur soccer club based in Seattle, Washington, who began plan in the NPSL in 2014. The team held a name-the-team contest. They finished 2nd out of four teams in the Northwest conference their first year of play.

References

External links
Official team site
NPSL page

Association football clubs established in 2013
National Premier Soccer League teams
Soccer clubs in Washington (state)
2013 establishments in Washington (state)